Jones Peninsula is an ice-covered peninsula  west of Hughes Peninsula in northwest Thurston Island, Antarctica. It was named by the Advisory Committee on Antarctic Names after Ensign Robert H. Jones, navigator and second pilot of PBM Mariner aircraft in the Eastern Group of U.S. Navy Operation HIGHJUMP, which obtained aerial photographs of this peninsula and coastal areas adjacent to Thurston Island, 1946–47.

Maps
 Thurston Island – Jones Mountains. 1:500000 Antarctica Sketch Map. US Geological Survey, 1967.
 Antarctic Digital Database (ADD). Scale 1:250000 topographic map of Antarctica. Scientific Committee on Antarctic Research (SCAR). Since 1993, regularly upgraded and updated.

References

Peninsulas of Ellsworth Land